The following highways are numbered 54A:

United States
 County Road 54A (Pasco County, Florida)
 Nebraska Spur 54A
 New York State Route 54A
 Oklahoma State Highway 54A